Fernando Miguel Pelissari or simply Fernando Miguel (born September 10, 1979 in Jandaia do Sul) is a Brazilian retired footballer who played as a midfielder, and the current manager of Paraná Clube.

Honours
Internacional
 Campeonato Gaúcho: 2004

References

1979 births
Brazilian footballers
Brazilian football managers
Association football midfielders
Campeonato Brasileiro Série A players
Campeonato Brasileiro Série B players
Campeonato Brasileiro Série B managers
Paraná Clube players
Cruzeiro Esporte Clube players
Sport Club Internacional players
Esporte Clube Bahia players
Santa Cruz Futebol Clube players
América Futebol Clube (MG) players
Goiás Esporte Clube players
Clube Atlético Juventus players
Veranópolis Esporte Clube Recreativo e Cultural players
Botafogo Futebol Clube (SP) players
Clube Atlético Sorocaba players
Paraná Clube managers
Living people